Stanley High School is a coeducational secondary school located in the resort town of Southport, Merseyside in North West England. It opened in 1952, with 300 pupils, and was named after Edward Stanley, 18th Earl of Derby. The school became a designated specialist Sports College in 2003, but in 2012 was renamed Stanley High School to celebrate the school's 60th anniversary. In 2016 the school was judged Inadequate by Ofsted and therefore became an academy in 2017. The school's academy sponsor is Southport Learning Trust. The school was rated Good following an Ofsted inspection in February 2020.

Dates and results of full inspections
 1996, outcome unstated
 2002, "improving and increasingly successful"
 2007, Satisfactory
 2010, Satisfactory
 2012, Requires Improvement
 2014, Requires Improvement
 2016, Inadequate
 2020, Good

Notable former pupils
 Lee Mack, Actor/Comedian
 Joanne Nicholas, Badminton player
 Marcus Wareing, Chef
Toby Savin, Footballer for Accrington Stanley
Craig Blundell, World renowned Drummer for Steven Wilson, Matt Berry, Steve Hackett (Genesis)

References

External links
 Stanley High School
 Facebook Page
 Twitter

Secondary schools in the Metropolitan Borough of Sefton
Academies in the Metropolitan Borough of Sefton
Buildings and structures in Southport